Sheshan is the name of an elevated station on Shanghai Metro Line 9. It is located near Sheshan Hill. Sheshan Station serves as a rush hour terminus of some trains on Line 9.

Railway stations in Shanghai
Shanghai Metro stations in Songjiang District
Railway stations in China opened in 2007
Line 9, Shanghai Metro